The 1998–99 season of the División de Honor de Futsal is the 10th season of top-tier futsal in Spain.

Regular season

League table

Playoffs

Goalscorers

See also
División de Honor de Futsal
Futsal in Spain

External links
1998–99 season at lnfs.es

1998 99
Spain
futsal